Nieh Pin-chieh (born June 12, 1988) is a Taiwanese swimmer, who specialized in sprint freestyle events. She represented the Chinese Taipei national team in two editions of the Olympic Games (2004 and 2008), competing in a sprint freestyle double.

Nieh made her own swimming history, as a 16-year-old teen, at the 2004 Summer Olympics in Athens, where she competed in the women's 50 m freestyle. Swimming in heat five, she posted a lifetime best of 27.09 seconds to pick up a fourth spot, but trailed behind Puerto Rico's Vanessa García by more than a second. Furthermore, Nieh tied for forty-first overall with Hungary's Zsuzsanna Csobánki in the prelims.

At the 2008 Summer Olympics in Beijing, Nieh qualified for her second Chinese Taipei team in the 100 m freestyle. She attained a FINA-B cut of 57.02 seconds from the National Games in her native Taipei a year earlier. Nieh challenged against five other swimmers in heat two, including three from Southeast Asia. She came only in fifth by nearly five eighths of a second (0.61) behind Christel Simms of the Philippines with a 57.28. Nieh failed to advance into the semifinals, as she placed forty-third out of 49 swimmers in the overall rankings.

References

External links
NBC Olympics Profile

1988 births
Living people
Taiwanese female freestyle swimmers
Olympic swimmers of Taiwan
Swimmers at the 2004 Summer Olympics
Swimmers at the 2008 Summer Olympics
Swimmers at the 2006 Asian Games
Sportspeople from Taipei
Asian Games competitors for Chinese Taipei
20th-century Taiwanese women
21st-century Taiwanese women